The 2008 Women's Six Nations Championship, also known as the 2008 RBS Women's 6 Nations due to the tournament's sponsorship by the Royal Bank of Scotland, was the seventh series of the rugby union Women's Six Nations Championship. England comfortably won a third successive Grand Slam—the first time this had been achieved in the Women's Six Nations. However, after a good start against Wales it was not quite as easily won as in the previous year, with Italy, Scotland and Ireland all scoring tries against the champions, something that only France managed in 2007.

While the England win was predictable it was Ireland that surprised many. Historically one of the weakest nations in the tournament, they only went down to narrow defeats to England, France, and Wales, while recording wins over both Italy and Scotland. The result was probably their best ever tournament performance.

The decline of Scottish women's rugby, on the other hand, continued. Though their performance against England showed hope for improvement, two successive defeats in two years to Ireland meant that Scotland ranked for the first time below the Irish, while defeat to Italy—the Italians' first ever Six Nations win—was the final blow in a disastrous campaign.

France—on paper the second best side in the event—were distinctly unimpressive, going down to their largest home defeat to England before losing to Wales for the second time in three years, the result being only third place. Wales, on the other hand, recovered from an English drubbing in the first game to finish in a well-deserved runners-up position.

Finally, the Italians surprised everyone with their Scottish win, following a campaign that had not appeared competitive in its first four games.

Final table

Results

Points scorers

See also
Women's Six Nations Championship
Women's international rugby

References

External links
The official RBS Six Nations Site

2008
2008 rugby union tournaments for national teams
2007–08 in Irish rugby union
2007–08 in English rugby union
2007–08 in Welsh rugby union
2007–08 in Scottish rugby union
2007–08 in French rugby union
2007–08 in Italian rugby union
2007–08 in European women's rugby union
rugby union
rugby union
rugby union
rugby union
Women
rugby union
rugby union
Women's Six Nations
Women's Six Nations